Cameron Sinclair is a Scottish composer, conductor and percussionist based in London.

Education
He trained at the Guildhall School of Music and Drama and the University of Sussex, studying composition with Martin Butler and Jonathan Harvey. He works with orchestras including the Philharmonia, Glyndebourne and Chamber Orchestra of Europe.

Career
In 2001 he was awarded an International Fellowship from the Arts Council of England to become Artist in Residence at Cittadellarte, an institution in Northern Italy dedicated to cross-disciplinary work directed by world-renowned visual artist Michelangelo Pistoletto. He collaborated with other members of Unidee  to create new work based on Pistoletto's philosophy of 'art at the centre of a responsible transformation of society', which was exhibited at Mukha in Antwerp, the Shedhalle  in Zurich and for Cittadellarte's Arte al Centro exhibitions in Biella and Turin.

He was director of the Vietato L'Accesso Festival, which took place in Biella, Italy, in September 2003. The festival was devised in collaboration with visual artists, architects, environmentalists and local food producers. The series of events - including Sinclair's participative concert La Memoria dell'Acqua - invited local people to become involved in the regeneration of old industrial buildings and change their perceptions of the neglected river area.

He continued his association with Michelangelo Pistoletto with an orchestral commission for Il Terzo Paradiso, a large-scale artistic takeover of the island of San Servolo for the Venice Biennale in 2005.

He was commissioned to create the opening event for the Turin Biennale in 2002, bringing together musicians representative of the diverse ethnic groups in Turin with a classical chamber orchestra to play together in Turin's temple of high culture, the Teatro Regio.

Site-specific installations with artist Alex Julyan include Safe and Sound, commissioned by Helix Arts for the City of Sunderland, Corridors of Power, selected for the International Society of Contemporary Music Festival and awarded the SPNM Butterworth Prize for new work and Composition of Impulses, which was exhibited at The Wapping Project.

He was Music Director and arranger for English Pocket Opera's new version of Carmen, which involved hundreds of Islington schoolchildren alongside a professional cast. He was also commissioned by them to make an arrangement of The Love of Three Oranges by Prokofiev for the Unicorn Theatre, London and The Magic Flute by Mozart, which was performed in London and Dublin by the Opera Theatre Company.

In 1998 he was Artistic Director of Centre Stage, an Arts Council of England project, creating a new opera based on paintings by Hogarth, performed as a professional National Theatre production in association with Tate Britain and the Orchestra of St. John's.

He made his BBC Proms conducting debut in 2000, directing Nitin Sawhney's Urban Prophecies with Joanna MacGregor, EnsembleBash and tabla player Aref Durvesh at the Royal Albert Hall. He also conducted a recording of the piece for the album Neural Circuits on the Soundcircus label.

He was associate composer with professional choral ensemble Singscape directed by Sarah Tenant-Flowers and was commissioned to write Say I Am You, a large-scale choral and orchestral work, premiered by Harlow Chorus and Britten Sinfonia.

Second Citizen is a collaboration with Angus Farquhar, former member of Test Dept. that fuses energetic marimba playing and live electronic music, which was greeted with critical acclaim after their first performance for the National Theatre, Scotland in their show Dear Europe. They have also worked with Optimo and with Aproxima Arts for Arbroath 2020+1 on Over Lunan a sonic installation and theatre piece performed in the dunes at Lunan Bay.

Recognition
In 2004 he won a British Composer Award for The Secret of the Universe.

Works
Works include
 La Città Invisibile, commissioned by the Turin Biennial 2002 and performed in the Teatro Regio conducted by the composer, which brought together a classical chamber orchestra with groups of Indian, Egyptian, Tibetan and Cuban musicians to create the opening event of the festival.
 Making Waves, a performance work developed from collaboration with musicians from the Royal College of Music and scientists from the Medical Research Council, commissioned for the Creating Sparks Festival, London
 Losing My Head, for pianist Joanna MacGregor
 We Are Stars, Alleluia and The End of the Universe commissioned by Singscape
 Time Gentlemen, Please, commissioned by the Derry Festival for Ensemble Bash and performed on their UK tour
To Infinity and Beyond commissioned by the National Youth Orchestra of Great Britain and performed by the Philharmonia and Malaysian Philharmonic Orchestra
 The Fly, integrating live electronics and performance, commissioned by New Noise and first performed at the Purcell Room, London at the Rhythm Sticks Festival and recorded for New Noise's CD released in June 2003
We are Stars, Alleluia, Story Water and De Angelis for Singscape
 Striking Distance, for the Orchestra of St. John's
 A sound installation at the Wapping Project as part of the SPNM 2003 festival
 A PRS award for a new work for the Britten Sinfonia and Harlow Chorus in 2005,

He teaches at the Royal College of Music.

References

External links
 Official site

Scottish classical composers
British male classical composers
21st-century classical composers
Year of birth missing (living people)
Living people
21st-century British male musicians